Toss is a 2017 Indian Kannada romantic comedy film written, directed and co-produced by Dayal Padmanabhan. The film stars Vijay Raghavendra, Sandeep and Ramya Barna in the lead roles. The film, under the banner of D Pictures and Om productions, was launched by Puneeth Rajkumar on 27 January 2012. After being in development for more than 5 years, the film is set to release on 21 July 2017.

Cast

 Vijay Raghavendra as Madhav
 Sandeep as Sandeep
 Ramya Barna
 Sihi Kahi Chandru
 Sihi Kahi Geetha
 Raju Thalikote
 Suchendra Prasad

Soundtrack 
Soundtrack was composed by Gautham Srivatsa.
"Yavude Sammandha" - Vijay Raghavendra
"Nidde Madi" - Devan Ekambaram, Charan Raj
"What Are You Doing" - Gurukiran, Chaithra HG
"Rottiyu Jaari" - Chaithra HG

Reception
The Times of India wrote that "The film has its share of drawbacks, such as some crass gay references for instance. But it surely is worth that trip to the cinema hall if you are in the mood for something hatke". Chitraloka wrote "There are some good peppy dialogues and lyrics in the film which keeps the story teeming with life. There is a tight script which helps the plot moving forward and surprise elements that keep popping up one after the other".

References

Sources 
 http://www.chitraloka.com/2012/01/25/dayals-ondu-roopayalli-eradu-preethi/
 http://movies.sulekha.com/kannada/ondu-roopayalli-eradu-preethi/default.htm
 https://archive.today/20130217224211/http://popcorn.oneindia.in/title/11312/ondu-roopayalli-eradu-preethi.html
 http://kannada.oneindia.in/movies/news/2012/01/27-ondu-roopayalli-eradu-preethi-by-dayal-aid0052.html
 http://wesandalwood.drupalgardens.com/aggregator/categories/1
 http://www.newindianexpress.com/entertainment/kannada/Kannada-Film-Set-for-Simultaneous-Theatre-Online-Release/2015/07/23/article2934542.ece

2010s Kannada-language films
2017 films
Indian romantic comedy films
2017 romantic comedy films
Films directed by Dayal Padmanabhan